The Kosovar Chess Championship is organized by the Kosovo Chess Federation, which was established in 1990 and joined FIDE in 2016. With the exception of a hiatus in 1998, the tournament has been held annually since 1991.

Winners

{| class="sortable wikitable"
! Year !! Champion
|-
| 1991 ||Alajdin Bejta
|-
| 1992 ||Armend Budima
|-
| 1993 ||Bajram Bujupi
|-
| 1994 ||Naim Sahitaj
|-
| 1995 ||Halim Halimi
|-
| 1996 ||Hazis Koxha
|-
| 1997 ||Naim Sahitaj
|-
| 1999 ||Ilirjan Jupa
|-
| 2000 ||Naim Sahitaj
|-
| 2001 ||Naim Sahitaj
|-
| 2002 || 
|-
| 2003 ||Sabahudin Kollari
|-
| 2004 ||Besnik Aliu
|-
| 2005 ||Përparim Makolli
|-
| 2006 ||Përparim Makolli
|-
| 2007 ||Ramadan Ajvazi
|-
| 2008 || 
|-
| 2009 ||Naim Sahitaj
|-
| 2010 ||Naim Sahitaj
|-
| 2011 ||Naim Sahitaj
|-
| 2012 ||Përparim Makolli
|-
| 2013 || Nderim Saraçi
|-
| 2014 ||Nderim Saraçi
|-
| 2015 ||Nderim Saraçi
|-
| 2016 ||Nderim Saraçi
|-
| 2017 ||Nderim Saraçi
|-
|2020
|Korab Saraci
|}

References

Chess in Kosovo
Chess national championships
1991 in chess
Recurring sporting events established in 1991
Sports competitions in Kosovo
1991 establishments in Kosovo
Annual events in Kosovo